Muğanlı (also, Mughanly) is a village and municipality in the Kurdamir District of Azerbaijan.

References 

Populated places in Kurdamir District